My Favorite Things is the first album by the jazz pianist Joey Alexander. Released in 2015, it earned Alexander a Grammy Award nomination for Best Jazz Instrumental Album.

Track listing

Personnel

Musicians 
Joey Alexander – piano, arrangements
Larry Grenadier – bass (tracks 1-4)
Russell Hall – bass (tracks 5, 7-8)
Ulysses Owens Jr – drums (tracks 1,2,4)
Sammy Miller – drums (tracks 5,7-8)
Alphonso Horne – trumpet (track 8)

Production 
Produced by Jason Olaine
Executive Producer: Jana Herzen
Recorded by Katherine Miller at Avatar Studio, NYC
Assistant Engineer: Nathan Odden
Mixed by Katherine Miller (Amnondale Recording)
Mastered by Alan Silverman: (Arf Mastering, NYC)
Illustration: James Gulliver Hancock
Photography/Design: Rebecca Meek

Charts

References

2015 albums
Joey Alexander albums